Crambus tutillus is a moth in the family Crambidae. It was described by James Halliday McDunnough in 1921. It is found in North America, where it has been recorded from British Columbia and Oregon.

References

Crambini
Moths described in 1921
Moths of North America